Brand New is the fifth studio album by American hip hop group Salt-N-Pepa, released on October 21, 1997, by London Records. The group's international label at the time, Red Ant Entertainment, filed for bankruptcy before the album was officially released. Salt-N-Pepa toured in support of the album, although the album had no other promotion whatsoever. Brand New spawned two singles: "R U Ready" and "Gitty Up". The album was certified gold by the Recording Industry Association of America (RIAA) on November 25, 1997.

Production
Brand New was the first Salt-N-Pepa album released after the group parted ways with longtime producer, writer, and manager Hurby "Luv Bug" Azor. Salt largely wrote, co-wrote, produced and co-produced the album.

Critical reception

Natasha Stovall of Rolling Stone praised the "richer piano-, guitar- and vocal-filled sound, emphasizing gritty soul and sweet, unadulterated funk." Jon Pareles of The New York Times wrote that the group "still juxtapose catchy come-ons ... and determinedly positive messages." Connie Johnson of the Los Angeles Times wrote that "while it's commendable that they're stretching out in a more uplifting, spiritually motivated arena, the group's forte is still worldly, raunchy, of-the-flesh fare."

Track listing

Notes
  signifies an additional producer
  signifies a co-producer

Samples
 "R U Ready" contains excerpts from "Watch Out" by Brass Construction.
 "Say Ooh" contains a sample from "Turn Off the Lights" by Larry Young.
 "Brand New" contains an interpolation of "Love Is Alive" by Gary Wright.

Personnel

 Prince Charles Alexander – Mixing
 Eddie Anzueto, Jr. – Percussion
 Steven Augustine – Bass
 Kent Belden – Creative Director
 Blue Denim – Background vocals
 Mike Campbell – Guitar
 Melvin Chandler – Keyboards
 Lewis Christian – Percussion
 Day Ta Day – Background vocals
 Andre Debourg – Engineer, Mixing
 James Denton – Photography
 Sandy "Pepa" Denton – Producer
 DJ Flexx – Background vocals
 Chad "Dr. Seuss" Elliott – Programming, Producer, Engineer, Mixing
 Glenn Ellis – Bass
 Esmail – Producer
 Alan Forney – Photo Imaging
 Kirk Franklin – Performer
 Wayne Garrick – Keyboards
 Khari Green – Guitar
 Bernard Grobman – Guitar
 Andrew Hellier – Guitar, Background vocals
 Cheryl "Salt" James – Producer
 Jon Jones – Guitar
 Gerhard Joost – Mixing
 Carol Kirkendall – Executive Producer
 LaTrece – Background vocals
 Michael Lockwood – Guitar
 Al (Taz) Machera – Mixing
 Sean "Mystro" Mather – Producer
 Gary Montoute – Synthesizer
 Michael Moore – Photography
 Rufus Moore – Background vocals, Performer
 Joseph Powell – Programming, Background vocals, Producer, Engineer, Mixing
 Wayne Rickard – Guitar
 Alicia Rushing – Background vocals
 Ken Schubert – Engineer, Mixing
 Dawne Shivers – Background vocals
 Peggy Sirota – Photography
 Sounds of Blackness – Performer
 Spinderella – Performer
 Kevin Thomas – Engineer
 Al West – Producer
 Jimmy White – Bass
 David Wynn – Producer
 George Belton - Bass

Charts

Certifications

Notes

References

1997 albums
Albums recorded at Chung King Studios
London Records albums
Salt-N-Pepa albums